The European Structural and Investment Funds (ESI Funds, ESIFs) are financial tools governed by a common rulebook, set up to implement the regional policy of the European Union, as well as the structural policy pillars of the Common Agricultural Policy and the Common Fisheries Policy. They aim to reduce regional disparities in income, wealth and opportunities. Europe's poorer regions receive most of the support, but all European regions are eligible for funding under the policy's various funds and programmes. The current framework is set for a period of seven years, from 2021 to 2027.

Overview 
Five ESIFs currently exist, they are:
under the Cohesion Policy:
the European Regional Development Fund (ERDF)
the Cohesion Fund (CF)
the European Social Fund Plus (ESF+)
under the Common Agricultural Policy (CAP):
the European Agricultural Fund for Rural Development (EAFRD)
under the Common Fisheries Policy (CFP):
the European Maritime, Fisheries and Aquaculture Fund (EMFAF)

ESIFs constitute the great bulk of EU funding, the majority of total EU spending. and are among the largest items of the budget of the European Union. Apart from them, there are also other EU funds that have the potential to contribute to the regional development, in particular the European Agricultural Guarantee Fund (EAGF), the Connecting Europe Facility, the InvestEU Programme, the Horizon Europe, or the Erasmus+.

It is up to the European Parliament and the Council of the European Union to define the tasks, priority objectives and the organisation of the Structural Funds (the Regional Policy framework), through the ordinary legislative procedure and consulting the Economic and Social Committee and the Committee of the Regions (leading to the publication of Regulations).

The key indicator for the division of regions under singular objectives is the Gross National Product per capita (GNP p.c.) level. This is subject to criticism based on the fact that GDP p.c. is unable to reflect the real socio-economic reality of regions. Some groups (e.g. Beyond GDP) and organisations propose the creation of a set of alternative indicators that could substitute the GDP and its derivates.

Funds management
The way the ESIFs are spent is based on a system of shared responsibility between the European Commission and the member state authorities:

 The commission negotiates and approves the NSRFs and OPs proposed by the member states, and uses these as a basis for allocating resources.
 The member states and their regions manage the programmes. This includes implementing the OPs by selecting individual projects, controlling and assessing them.
 The commission is involved in overall programme monitoring, pays out approved expenditure and verifies the national control systems.

Prior to 1989, funding decisions were taken by the European Commission. This was followed by a period where EU member states tried to maximize control, with little systematic project appraisal and a focus on a small number of large projects. Since 1994 more systematic, co-ordinated and complex methods of allocating resources start to be introduced. For example, most funds within the 2004–06 Integrated Regional Operational Programme (IROP), and its 2007–13 successor (ROP), are allocated through largely need-based project-selection mechanisms. Regions with low GDP receive more funds. However, within these regions, more funds go to relatively rich local areas with the best institutions. It has been argued that part of this can be explained by the frequent need to co-fund projects, and the needed capacity to prepare applications.

The ESI Funds

The European Regional Development Fund (ERDF)
The ERDF supports programmes addressing regional development, economic change, enhanced competitiveness and territorial co-operation throughout the EU. Funding priorities include modernising economic structures, creating sustainable jobs and economic growth, research and innovation, environmental protection and risk prevention. Investment in infrastructure also retains an important role, especially in the least-developed regions.

The European Social Fund Plus (ESF+)
The ESF+ focuses on four key areas: increasing the adaptability of workers and enterprises, enhancing access to employment and participation in the labour market, reinforcing social inclusion by combating discrimination and facilitating access to the labour market for disadvantaged people, and promoting partnership for reform in the fields of employment and inclusion.

The Cohesion Fund
The Cohesion Fund contributes to interventions in the field of the environment and trans-European transport networks. It applies to member states with a gross national income (GNI) of less than 90% of the EU average. As such, it covers the 13 new member states as well as Greece and Portugal.

The European Agricultural Fund for Rural Development (EAFRD)

The European Maritime, Fisheries and Aquaculture Fund (EMFAF)

Objectives for 2007–2013
Sections below present information about objectives that have been defined for the programming period, which runs from 1 January 2007 to 31 December 2013. The overall budget for this period is €347bn: €201bn for the European Regional Development Fund, €76bn for the European Social Fund, and €70bn for the Cohesion Fund.
The objectives setup shapes the main focus of interventions (eligible activities and costs) and the overall allocations of funds from the EU budget.

Convergence objective (formerly Objective 1)
This objective covers regions whose GDP per capita is below 75% of the EU average and aims at accelerating their economic development. It is financed by the ERDF, the ESF and the Cohesion Fund. The priorities under this objective are human and physical capital, innovation, knowledge society, environment and administrative efficiency. The budget allocated to this objective is €283.3bn in current prices.

Regional Competitiveness and Employment objective (formerly Objective 2)
This objective covers all regions of the EU territory, except those already covered by the Convergence objective. It aims at reinforcing competitiveness, employment and attractiveness of these regions. Innovation, the promotion of entrepreneurship and environment protection are the main themes of this objective.
The funding – €55bn in current prices – comes from the ERDF and the ESF.

European Territorial Cooperation objective (formerly Objective 3)

European Territorial Cooperation is an objective of the European Union's Cohesion Policy for the period 2007–2013, serving its ultimate goal to strengthen the economic and social cohesion of the Union. Regions and cities from different Member States are encouraged to work together, learning from each other and developing joint projects and networks.
With the Convergence Objective and the Regional Competitiveness and Employment Objective it aims at contributing to reduce regional disparities across Union's territory.

The EUR 8.7 billion allocated to the European Territorial Cooperation objective represents 2.5% of the total budget for Cohesion Policy in 2007–2013 and is financed by the European Regional Development Fund (ERDF). It supports cross-border, transnational and interregional cooperation programmes, helping Member States to participate in European Union (EU) external border cooperation programmes supported by other instruments (Instrument for Pre-Accession and European Neighbourhood Policy Instrument).

History
The European Territorial Cooperation Objective replaced the previous INTERREG Community Initiative (in the period 2000–2006) and thus many European Territorial Cooperation programmes bear the name INTERREG.
The "objectives" were introduced with the Single European Act as a criterion to make the Structural Funds spending more effective as Regional Policy started to be rationalised in a perspective of economic and social cohesion. The Single European Act, that entered into force in 1987, institutionalised the goal of completing the internal market with a total borders opening, by 31 December 1992. Regional competition would be tighter and a Cohesion Policy was needed to mitigate the negative side effects of market unification.
The "objectives" were then created to discipline the capture of funds in terms of economic and social cohesion across the Union's territory. In the first multiannual financial framework, 1988–1999, there were seven objectives, which have been progressively reduced. 
Even though European Territorial Cooperation Objective is the smallest of the three Cohesion Policy objectives (in terms of budget), it gained a critical importance to address the key challenges of the European Union, particularly with some redefinitions of the Treaty of Lisbon ( entered into force on 1 December 2009), and for contributing to achieve the goals of Europe 2020, the EU's growth strategy.

Institutional and legal framework
In its title on Economic, Social and Territorial Cohesion, the Treaty on the Functioning of the European Union establishes that 'the Union shall develop and pursue its actions leading to the strengthening of its economic, social and territorial cohesion'. By introducing the concept of territorial cohesion, the Treaty of Lisbon recognised a strong territorial dimension for the cohesion policy. This territorial approach requires a unique and modern governance system, combining different levels of government (European, national, regional and local).

Member States thus conduct their economic policies and coordinate them for the promotion of the 'economic, social and territorial cohesion'. European Territorial Cooperation is a component of the economic policy framework of the Union.

The current Regional Policy framework, sustained by Structural Funds, is set for a period of seven years, from 2007 to 2013. For this period, the following regulations (and the changes in detail made to them by means of subsequent regulations) are especially important in defining the organisation of European Territorial Cooperation:
 Regulation (EC) No 1080/2006 of the European Parliament and of the Council of 5 July 2006 on the European Regional Development Fund and repealing Regulation (EC) No 1783/1999.
 Council Regulation (EC) No 1083/2006 of 11 July 2006 laying down general provisions on the European Regional Development Fund, the European Social Fund and the Cohesion Fund and repealing Regulation (EC) No 1260/1999.
 Commission Regulation (EC) No 1828/2006 of 8 December 2006, setting out rules for the implementation of Council Regulation (EC) No 1083/2006, laying down general provisions on the European Regional Development Fund, the European Social Fund and the Cohesion Fund and of Regulation (EC) No 1080/2006 of the European Parliament and of the Council on the European Regional Development Fund.
The European Territorial Cooperation Objective is financed by the European Regional Development Fund, whereas the remaining two objectives of the Cohesion Policy set for the 2007–2013 period are also financed by the European Social Fund (Regional Competitiveness and Employment Objective), and, in the case with the Convergence Objective, also the Cohesion Fund.

Organization
As with the remaining two objectives, the European Territorial Cooperation Objective is delivered by means of multi-annual programmes aligned on the Union's objectives and priorities, expressed on the multi-annual financial framework. 
Each programme has a managing authority and a Joint Technical Secretariat, headquartered within the area it serves. They are responsible for the correct implementation of the programme, both from a financial and from an operational perspective. 

Within European Territorial Cooperation, there are three types of programmes:
 Cross-border cooperation (53 programmes): These programmes help transform regions located on either side of internal or external borders of the European Union into strong economic and social poles. The main goals of these programmes are to face common problems and mitigate the negative effects of administrative, legal and physical barriers of borders. The cooperation process is stressed through joint management of programmes and projects that stimulate mutual trust and understanding.
In particular, cross-border actions are encouraged in the fields of entrepreneurship, improving joint management of natural resources, supporting links between urban and rural areas, improving access to transport and communication networks, developing joint use of infrastructure, administrative cooperation and capacity building, employment, community interaction, culture and social affairs.
 Transnational Cooperation (13 programmes): The transnational programmes promote cooperation among greater European regions, including the ones surrounding sea basins (e.g. Baltic Sea Region, North Sea, Mediterranean and Atlantic Area) or mountain ranges (e.g. Alpine Space), and facilitate coordinated strategic responses to joint challenges, such as flood management, transport and communication corridors, international business and research linkages, urban development and others. Special attention is given to outermost and island regions (e.g. Indian Ocean, Caribbean Area or Northern Periphery).
 The interregional cooperation programme (INTERREG IVC) and three networking programmes (URBACT II, INTERACT II and ESPON) cover all 27 Member States of the Union (and, in some cases, also the cross-border cooperation programmes within the Instrument for Pre-Accession and the European Neighbourhood Policy Instrument, as well as cross-border cooperation with third countries, such as Norway and Switzerland).
Together and in their specific fields, these programmes provide a framework for exchanging experience between regional and local bodies in different countries. 
The Instrument for Pre-Accession and the European Neighbourhood Policy Instrument are the two financial instruments dedicated to support territorial cooperation between European Member States border regions and their neighbours in accession countries and in other partner countries of the Union. The former currently finances 10 programmes and the latter 13 programmes.

Strategic approach for 2007-2013
This section explains the interplay between different political levels – European, national and regional – in determining the priorities for the Structural Funds and the guidelines for implementing regional projects. In general, the overarching priorities for the Structural Funds are set at the EU level and then transformed into national priorities by the member states and regions.

At the EU level the overarching priorities are established in the Community Strategic Guidelines (CSG). These set the framework for all actions that can be taken using the funds. Within this framework, each member state develops its own National Strategic Reference Framework (NSRF). The NSRF sets out the priorities for the respective member state, taking specific national policies into account. Finally, Operational Programmes for each region within the member state are drawn up in accordance with the respective NSRF, reflecting the needs of individual regions.

 EU Level: Community Strategic Guidelines,
 National Level: National Strategic Reference Framework for each member state,
 Regional Level: Operational Programme for each region.

Community Strategic Guidelines
The Community Strategic Guidelines (CSG) contain the principles and priorities of the EU's cohesion policy and suggest ways the European regions can take full advantage of the funding that has been made available for national and regional aid programmes for the period 2007–2013. There are three priorities: 
 Improving the attractiveness of member states, regions and cities by improving accessibility, ensuring adequate quality and level of services, and preserving their environmental potential;
 Encouraging innovation, entrepreneurship and the growth of the knowledge economy by supporting research and innovation capacities, including new information and communication technologies;
 Creating more and better jobs by attracting more people into employment entrepreneurial activity, improving adaptability of workers and enterprises and increasing investment in human capital.

National Strategic Reference Framework
A National Strategic Reference Framework (NSRF) establishes the main priorities for spending the EU structural funding a member state receives between 2007 and 2013. Each member state has its own NSRF. Adopting an NSRF is a new requirement of the Structural Funds regulations for 2007 to 2013. Each NSRF functions as a high-level strategy for the Operational Programmes in the respective member state. The document provides an overview of the economic strengths and weaknesses of the member state's regions, and out the approach to future Structural Funds spending across the member state.

Operational Programmes
An Operational Programme (OP) sets out a region's priorities for delivering the funds. Although there is scope for regional flexibility, a region's priorities must be consistent with the member state's NSRF. There is an Operational Programme for each region in the EU. These OPs, just like the NSRF, have to be approved by the European Commission before any implementation.

New architecture for 2014–2020
The European Commission has adopted a draft legislative package which will frame cohesion policy for 2014–2020. The new proposals are designed to reinforce the strategic dimension of the policy and to ensure that EU investment is targeted on Europe's long-term goals for growth and jobs ("Europe 2020").

Through partnership contracts agreed with the commission, member states will commit to focussing on fewer investment priorities in line with these objectives. The package also harmonises the rules related to different funds, including rural development and maritime and fisheries, to increase the coherence of EU action.

See also
 Budget of the European Union
 Committee of the Regions
 Council of the European Union
 Economic and Social Committee
 European legislative procedure
 European Investment Bank
 European Union
 European Union Regional policy
 ERDF
 ESF
 European Grouping for Territorial Cooperation
 European Parliament
 INTERREG
 Treaty of Lisbon
 Single European Act

References

General
 EUR-Lex.eur.eu: Consolidated versions of the Treaty on European Union and the Treaty on the Functioning of the European Union (Retrieved 9 May 2012).
 interact-eu.net: Cohesion: 2007–2013 Policy framework (Retrieved 10 May 2012).
 interact-eu.net: Cohesion Policy: 2007–2013 regulatory framework (Retrieved 10 May 2012).
 Directorate General for Regional Policy (European Commission), Three Objectives (Retrieved 9 May 2012).
 Directorate General for Regional Policy (European Commission), European Territorial Cooperation (Retrieved 9 May 2012).
 Directorate General for Regional Policy (European Commission), Cross-border Cooperation Programmes (Retrieved 9 May 2012).
 Directorate General for Regional Policy (European Commission), Interregional Cooperation (Retrieved 9 May 2012).
 Directorate General for Regional Policy (European Commission), Structural Funds Regulations 2007–2013 (Retrieved 9 May 2012).
 Single Market – Communication from the European Commission (Retrieved 22 August 2012)
 http://europa.eu/legislation_summaries/institutional_affairs/treaties/treaties_singleact_en.htm  (Retrieved 22 August 2012)

External links
 Open Data Portal for the European Structural Investment Funds
 European Commission
 Community Strategic Guidelines 2007–2013
 Operational Programmes for all European regions
 Outcomes of European Territorial Cooperation (by INTERACT)
 European Territorial Cooperation: building bridges between people (by the Directorate General for Regional Policy, European Commission)
 Searchable database of European Territorial Cooperation programmes, projects, partners and statistics (KEEP)
 Directorate General for Regional Policy (European Commission)
 INTERACT
 

Economy of the European Union